Pentomone (developmental code name Lilly 113935 or LY-113935) is a nonsteroidal antiandrogen (NSAA) described as a "prostate growth inhibitor" which was never marketed. It was synthesized and assayed in 1978.

References

Ethers
Heterocyclic compounds with 5 rings
Ketones
Nonsteroidal antiandrogens
Oxygen heterocycles
Methoxy compounds